Vazhkai / Jeevitham may refer to:

 Vazhkai, 1949 Tamil film produced and directed by A. V. Meiyappan and starred by Vyjayanthimala in her screen debut
 Jeevitham (1950 film), 1950 Telugu film produced and directed by A. V. Meiyappan and starred by Vyjayanthimala in her Telugu cinema debut
 Bahar (film), 1951 Hindi film produced by A. V. Meiyappan and directed by M. V. Raman while starred by Vyjayanthimala in her Hindi cinema debut